The men's marathon at the 1934 European Athletics Championships was held in Turin, Italy, on 9 September 1934.

Medalists

Results

Final
From September 9.

Participation
According to an unofficial count, 15 athletes from 9 countries participated in the event.

 (2)
 (1)
 (2)
 (2)
 (2)
 (1)
 (2)
 (1)
 (2)

References

Marathon
Marathons at the European Athletics Championships
Marathons in Italy
Men's marathons